Patrick McGowan (1842 – April 17, 1893) was an Irish-American politician from New York.

Life 
McGowan was born in 1842 in Ireland. He immigrated to America as a child, settling in Brooklyn. In 1867, he opened a retail dry goods business. He was also a large property owner in the Brooklyn Eighth Ward, and helped organize young men's Catholic literary societies in the city.

In 1877, he ran for Brooklyn alderman as an Independent, but lost to Daniel McIntyre. In 1879, he again ran for alderman but lost to James Weir, Jr.

In 1892, McGowan was elected to the New York State Assembly as a Democrat, representing the Kings County 6th District. He served in the Assembly in 1893.

McGowan died at home on April 17, 1893, from pneumonia. He was buried in Holy Cross Cemetery.

References

External links 

 The Political Graveyard

1842 births
1893 deaths
Irish emigrants to the United States (before 1923)
Politicians from Brooklyn
Businesspeople from Brooklyn
Democratic Party members of the New York State Assembly
19th-century American politicians
Deaths from pneumonia in New York (state)
Burials at Holy Cross Cemetery, Brooklyn
Catholics from New York (state)
19th-century American businesspeople